Leatrice Eiseman is an American color specialist, who assists companies in their color choice in a range of areas, including packaging, logos, and interior design. She is the executive director of the Pantone Color Institute, a division of Pantone, Inc., and the author of six books on color, one of which won an award from the Independent Publisher's Association.

Background
Eiseman holds a degree in psychology from Antioch University, and a counseling certificate from UCLA. She has studied and taught in the fields of fashion and interior design. She is an allied member of the Industrial Designers Society of America and the Fashion Group International, and has received a prestigious service award from the Color Marketing Group. She also selects the 10 top fashion colors twice yearly for Pantone and Women's Wear Daily.

Publications
Colors for Your Every Mood (1998)
Pantone Guide to Communicating with Color (2000)
The Color Answer Book (2003)
More Alive With Color (2006)
Color: Messages and Meanings (2006)
Pantone: The 20th Century in Color (2011)
Pantone on Fashion:  A Century of Color in Design (2014)
The Complete Color Harmony:  Pantone Edition (2017)

References

21st-century American women writers
Living people
Year of birth missing (living people)
Antioch University alumni
American women business executives